Pessac is a commune in the Gironde department in Nouvelle-Aquitaine in southwestern France. It is a member of the metropolis of Bordeaux, being the second-largest suburb of Bordeaux and located just southwest of it. Pessac is also home to Bordeaux Montaigne University and the Institut d'études politiques de Bordeaux.

Geography 

Pessac is located in the south of the Bordeaux metro area and is surrounded by Bordeaux, Talence, Gradignan, Canéjan, Cestas, Saint-Jean-d'Illac and Mérignac.

The western part of the commune is part of the Landes de Bordeaux.

History 

Early in World War II (June 22, 1940), the town was the scene of a quadruple execution on the firing range of Verthamon. Four communists militants, one of whom, Roger Rambaud, was not yet 17, were among the escapees from the military prison in Paris, were killed in the utmost secrecy by soldiers of the Third Republic. This case, classified "Secret Defense" for 70 years, has recently been revealed by the historian Jacky Tronel in the history magazine Arkheia.

Neighborhoods 

Neighborhoods of Pessac :

 Verthamon
 Les échoppes
 Brivazac - Candau
 Noës
 Pessac-bourg
 Casino
 Sardine
 Chiquet
 Compostelle - La Paillère
 Le Monteil
 CCLAPS - La Chataigneraie
 Saige - Formanoir
 3 M (Macédo, Mirante, Monbalon)
 France - L'Alouette
 Cap de Bos
 Magonty - Romainville
 Toctoucau

Heritage

Wineries 
Located on the Pessac-Léognan appellation, there are several wineries, including the oldest of the Bordeaux wine regions, château Haut-Brion.

Cité Frugès 

Built by Le Corbusier in 1926, the district is an experimental housing for workers. This is one of the 17 architectural works of Le Corbusier listed as a UNESCO World Heritage Site since 2016.

Casino district 

Quarter built in the 1900s with a resort city architecture.

Others

Population

Education

9 Kindergartens

15 Grade schools

5 Middle schools
 Collège Alouette
 Collège François Mitterrand (Ladonne)
 Collège Gérard Philipe
 Collège Pessac (Noès)
 Collège Sainte-Jeanne d'Arc Assomption

3 High schools
 : financed by the French government and the Communauté urbaine de Bordeaux (CUB), this school, presented as the high school of the year 2000, was inaugurated on 9 July 1987 by Jacques Chirac, then Prime Minister. Its initial capacity was 1,100 students including 900 "demi-pensionnaires". It was expanded in 1990 and now holds 1,260 students.
 Lycée Sans Frontière
 Lycée professionnel Philadelphe de Gerde

Transportation
Pessac has a railway station on the westbound line from Bordeaux, Gare de Pessac. Pessac is also served by the urban transport network of the Bordeaux agglomeration, Transports Bordeaux Métropole (TBM).

Pessac is located on line B of the Tramway de Bordeaux.

Personalities
 1929: Yvette Roudy, socialist minister
 1938: Jean Eustache, film actor and director (d. 1981)
 1953: Patrice Brun (historian)
 1971: Thierry Poulain-Rehm, university
 1979: , handball player
 1980: (18 August) , matador

Twin towns - sister cities
Pessac is twinned with:

 Banfora, Burkina Faso
 Burgos, Spain
 Galați, Romania
 Göppingen, Germany
 Viana do Castelo, Portugal

See also
Château Haut-Brion
Pessac-Léognan, wine appellation
Communes of the Gironde department
Operation Josephine B, a 1941 attack on an electricity substation.

References

External links

 Official website

 
Communes of Gironde